Svein Erik Nilsen (born 25 July 1944) is a Norwegian rower. He competed in the men's coxless four event at the 1972 Summer Olympics.

References

1944 births
Living people
Norwegian male rowers
Olympic rowers of Norway
Rowers at the 1972 Summer Olympics
Place of birth missing (living people)